Charles Lee Faust (April 24, 1879 – December 17, 1928) was a U.S. Representative from Missouri.

Born near Bellefontaine, Ohio, Faust moved with his parents to a farm near Highland, Kansas.
He attended the public schools and Highland University.
He engaged in teaching in a country school near Highland in 1898–1900.
He was graduated from the law department of the University of Kansas at Lawrence in 1903, was admitted to the bar the same year, and commenced the practice of his profession in St. Joseph, Missouri.
City counselor of St. Joseph in 1915–1919.

Faust was elected as a Republican to the Sixty-seventh and to the three succeeding Congresses and served from March 4, 1921, until his death.
He served as chairman of the Committee on the Census (Sixty-eighth Congress).
Had been reelected to the Seventy-first Congress.
He died December 17, 1928, at the United States Naval Hospital, Washington, D.C.
He was interred in Highland Cemetery, Highland, Kansas.

See also
List of United States Congress members who died in office (1900–49)

References

1879 births
1928 deaths
University of Kansas School of Law alumni
Missouri city council members
Republican Party members of the United States House of Representatives from Missouri